Lachlan Lonergan (born 11 October 1999) is an Australian professional rugby union player. He plays as a hooker for the Brumbies in Super Rugby and has represented  in international rugby.

Rugby career
Lonergan played for the Australia U20 team at the World Rugby Under 20 Championship in 2019. He signed with the Brumbies later that year, linking up with his older brother Ryan who had joined the franchise in 2018. He was named in the Brumbies squad for the 2020 season.

Super Rugby statistics

Reference list

External links
 

1999 births
Australian rugby union players
Australia international rugby union players
Living people
Rugby union hookers
Canberra Vikings players
ACT Brumbies players